"Big Beach" can refer to:

 Big Beach, Nova Scotia, a city in Canada
 Big Beach, a beach in Makena State Park in Hawaii
 Big Beach (company), an American film production company

See also
 Big Beach Sports
 Big Beach Boutique II
 Playa Grande (disambiguation)